Tanhai is an Urdu word means Loneliness, it may refer to:

 Tanhai (film), 1972 Indian film
 Tanhai (TV series), 2013 Pakistani television serial